Fadden Lake is a lake in Sibley County, in the U.S. state of Minnesota.

Fadden Lake bears the name of James Fadden, a pioneer who settled at the lake in 1869.

See also
List of lakes in Minnesota

References

Lakes of Minnesota
Lakes of Sibley County, Minnesota